or lonely death refers to a Japanese phenomenon of people dying alone and remaining undiscovered for a long period of time. The phenomenon was first described in the 1980s. Kodokushi has become an increasing problem in Japan, attributed to economic troubles and Japan's increasingly elderly population. It is also known as  – "isolation death", and  – "live alone death".

History
Kodokushi was first documented in Japanese newspapers during the 1970s, and studies exploring the phenomenon began as early as 1973, with surveys conducted by the National Social Welfare Council and National Union of Voluntary District Welfare Commissioners. The first instance that became national news in Japan was in 2000 when the corpse of a 69-year-old man was discovered three years after his death; his monthly rent and utilities had been withdrawn automatically from his bank account and only after his savings were depleted was his skeleton discovered at his home. The body had been consumed by maggots and beetles.

Statistics

Statistics regarding kodokushi are often incomplete or inaccurate. Japan's public broadcaster NHK reported that 32,000 elderly people nationwide died alone in 2009. The number of kodokushi tripled between 1983 and 1994, with 1,049 lonely deaths reported in Tokyo in 1994. In 2008, there were more than 2,200 reported lonely deaths in Tokyo. Similar numbers were reported in 2011. One private moving company in Osaka reported that 20 percent of the moving company's jobs (300 per year) involved removing the belongings of people who had died lonely deaths. Approximately 4.5% of funerals in 2006 involved instances of kodokushi.

Kodokushi mostly affects men who are 50 or older.

Causes

Several reasons for the increase in kodokushi have been proposed. One proposed reason is increased social isolation. A decreasing proportion of elderly Japanese people are living in multi-generational housing and are instead living alone. Elderly people who live alone are more likely to lack social contacts with family and neighbors, and are therefore more likely to die alone and remain undiscovered.

Additionally, the economic slump in Japan since 1990 has been cited as contributing to the increase in lonely deaths. Since 1990, many Japanese businessmen have been forced into early retirement. Many of these men have never married and become socially isolated when removed from the corporate culture.

Masaki Ichinose, head of the University of Tokyo's Institute of Death and Life Studies, hypothesizes that the increase in kodokushi is linked to Japan's contemporary culture which ignores death. Several hundred years ago, Japanese people commonly confronted death; for example, bodies were typically buried by family members. In contrast, in modern Japan, there are fewer opportunities to witness death and death is not readily discussed.

Hypothesized psychological reasons for the increase in kodokushi include social apathy and life stress. Social isolation is used as a coping mechanism to avoid stressful situations. Scholars have also analyzed how "contemporary discourse constructs kodokushi as a "bad death" and as evidence for the decay of "traditional" social bonds, such as family, neighborhood and company ties," with government and community initiatives thereby pushing "to implement new welfare systems, often suggesting to re-activate lost family and community bonds".

Responses

Some districts in Japan have begun campaigns and movements to prevent lonely deaths. Officials in Tokyo's Shinjuku Ward have started a kodokushi awareness campaign that includes scheduled social events and checking in on the well-being of elderly citizens.

An artist from Japan started creating miniature dioramas of the rooms where Kodokushi victims were found. She works as a lonely death cleaner and the miniatures are composites of the places she cleaned. Her aim is to raise awareness for the phenomenon.

In other countries
The phenomenon has been highlighted as a cause for concern in Hong Kong and South Korea. Like Japan, both have ageing populations and increasing numbers of elderly people living alone and isolated.

In South Korea, the equivalent is called godoksa (Hangul: 고독사), the Korean pronunciation of the Hanja characters. As godoksa is not a legal term, such deaths are often classified as "unconnected deaths". The term has been expanded to describe deaths (whether natural or suicide) of the middle-aged who are single and withdrawn from society.

See also

 Hikikomori
 Karoshi
 Parasite single
 Suicide in Japan

References

Death in Japan
Japanese words and phrases
Geriatrics